Behind Every Star is a 2022 South Korean television series directed by Baek Seung-ryong, and starring Lee Seo-jin, Kwak Sun-young, Seo Hyun-woo and Joo Hyun-young. Based on the French TV series Call My Agent!, it premiered on tvN on November 7, 2022, and aired every Monday and Tuesday at 22:30 (KST) for 12 episodes. It is available for streaming on Netflix in selected regions.

In December 2022, a second season was confirmed.

Synopsis
It depicts the lives of celebrity managers of entertainment management company called Method Entertainment, whose work is professional and life is an amateur.

Cast

Main
 Lee Seo-jin as Matthew / Tae-oh
General director of Method Entertainment.
 Kwak Sun-young as Chun Jane / Jae-in
A manager with 14 years of experience. She started as a field manager and rose to the position of team leader.
 Seo Hyun-woo as Kim Jung-don
He is a team leader of Method Entertainment, a good manager having a good personality.
 Joo Hyun-young as So Hyun-joo
A new manager, who has admired the entertainment industry since childhood.

Supporting

People around Matthew 
 Shin Hyun-seung as Go Eun-gyul
Tae Oh's son and new actor from Method Entertainment.
 Jung Hye-young as Song Eun-ha 
 Matthew's wife and mother Go Eun-gyul.

People around Chun Jae-in 
 Noh Sang-hyun as Lee Sang-wook
The head of the investigation team of the Seoul Revenue Agency.

People around So Hyun-joo 
 Kim Young-ah as So Jung-hee  
 So Hyun-joo's mother and The owner of a hair salon in Busan has a strong and sweet personality.

Method Entertainment 
 Shim So-young as Shim Myeong-ae
Method Entertainment Honorary Director.
 Kim Gook-hee as Yoo Eun-soo
Method Entertainment general manager, she joined the accountant and moved to the management team but she began to develop a fear of driving.
 Kim Tae-oh as Choi Jin-hyuk
Method Entertainment Public Relations Manager.
 Hwang Se-on as Kang Hee-sun
Information desk employee who aspires to be an actor.
 Choi Yeon-gyu as Choi Won-jae
Field Manager and Agent 'Prince Prince' works as a powerful force of Method Entertainment.
 Lee Hwang-ui as Wang Se-ja
Method Enter president, who died from climbing.

Other 
 Lee Ji Hye as Amy - Ceo of director Talundinor
 Kim Won-hae as Cho Ki-bong 
 CEO of Star Media.
 Moon Hee-kyung as Kang Kyung-ok
 Wang Se-ja's wife.

Special appearances
 Cho Yeo-jeong as herself, an actress affiliated with Method Entertainment
 Kim Soo-mi as herself
 Lee Hee-joon as himself, an actor from Method Entertainment
 Claudia Kim as herself, an actress who returned after giving birth
 Seo Hyo-rim as herself
 Jin Seon-kyu as himself, an actor from Method Entertainment
 Young Tak as himself, a new star who has gained popularity
 Park Ho-san as himself
 Oh Na-ra as herself
 Kim Soo-ro as himself 
 Kim Ho-young as himself
 Choi Soo-rin as Joo Ha-min's mother
 Kim So-hyun as herself 
 Son Jun-ho as himself
Heo Sung-tae as Goo Hae-joon
A successful businessman who moved to the United States in his 20s and developed a dating app, He took over as the new representative of Method Entertainment.
 Kim Ji-hoon as himself
 Na Young-seok as himself 
 Kim Joo-ryoung as herself
 No Min-woo as Oh Hyun, a genius actor, and film director.  
 Daniel Henney as himself 
 Ryu Hyun-kyung as Ye Min-soo, Film director. 
 Kim Ah-hyun as Ah-hyun, world class model  
 Lee Soon-jae as himself
 Kim Ah-joong as herself

Production

Development
In May 2021, Studio Dragon announced that they are remaking the French drama series Call My Agent! (Dix pour cent), as they have signed an official publishing right contract. Studio Dragon CP Yoo Sang-won said, "The character and story are really attractive, so I purchased the original, and now the script is going smoothly, and casting will start soon." He further stated, "A well-made drama with this will be released soon."

Casting
In October 2021, Lee Seo-Jin was offered the role of main character in the Korean version of Surviving as a Celebrity Manager. At the same time Kwak Sun-young was offered the role of female lead in the remake series.

Filming
The series, produced by Studio Dragon and Baram Pictures, is a hardcore workplace comedy drama, whose principal photography began on June 8, 2022.

On October 31, tvN announced that it had postponed the drama's press conference, which was originally scheduled for November 2nd. A new date will be announced at a later date due to the aftermath of the Seoul Halloween crowd crush.

Original soundtrack

Part 1

Part 2

Part 3

Part 4

Part 5

Viewership

References

External links
  
 
 
 
 Behind Every Star at Daum 

2022 South Korean television series debuts
2022 South Korean television series endings
TVN (South Korean TV channel) television dramas
Korean-language television shows
South Korean comedy-drama television series
Television series by Studio Dragon
South Korean workplace television series
South Korean television series based on non-South Korean television series
Korean-language Netflix exclusive international distribution programming